The Balboa 26 is an American trailerable sailboat that was designed by Lyle C. Hess as cruiser and first built in 1969.

Production
The design was initially built by Arthur Marine starting in 1969. It was then built by Coastal Recreation in the United States, between about 1972 and 1976, but it is now out of production.

Design
The Balboa 26 is a recreational keelboat, built predominantly of fiberglass, with wood trim. The boat is all solid laminate fiberglass, with the deck plywood cored. The boat has a masthead sloop rig, a raked stem, a slightly angled transom, an internally mounted spade-type rudder controlled by a tiller and a lifting keel or optional fixed fin keel. The keel is actuated by a 12:1 mechanical advantage winch. The rudder can be removed from the transom from the cockpit. The boat displaces  and carries  of ballast.

The boat is normally fitted with a small outboard motor for docking and maneuvering.

The design has sleeping accommodation for five people, with a double "V"-berth in the bow cabin, a straight settee in the main cabin on the starboard side and drop-down dinette table that converts to a double berth on the port side. The galley is located on both sides of the companionway ladder. The galley is equipped with a two-burner stove to starboard and an ice box and sink to port. The head is located just aft of the bow cabin on the port side. The standard cabin deck was shag carpet, with teak optional.

For sailing downwind the design may be equipped with a symmetrical spinnaker.

Operational history
In a 2008 review in Cruising World Matt Djos wrote, "Under sail, the Balboa 26 is quite stiff. The boat is fast and maneuverable, but it's a handful for a novice sailor. The 26 has noticeable weather helm, and the tiller requires constant attention. As with most boats of this type, the swing keel has a tendency to rumble at hull speed, which is a little more than 6 knots."

David Liscio, writing for Sailing Magazine in 2017, noted, "the Balboa 26 is a trailerable, stoutly-constructed, economical cruising boat ideal for a couple or small family planning to gunkhole or sail the open sea."

See also
List of sailing boat types

References

External links
Photo of a Balboa 26

Keelboats
1960s sailboat type designs
Sailing yachts
Trailer sailers
Sailboat type designs by Lyle Hess
Sailboat types built by Arthur Marine
Sailboat types built by Coastal Recreation, Inc